Micropleura is a genus of nematodes belonging to the family Micropleuridae.

Species:

Micropleura australiensis 
Micropleura helicospicula 
Micropleura indica 
Micropleura vazi 
Micropleura vivipara

References

Nematodes